Al-Qaisin is a sub-district located in As Sawma'ah District, Al Bayda Governorate, Yemen. Al-Qaisin had a population of 3334 according to the 2004 census.

References 

Sub-districts in As Sawma'ah District